Kurmademys is an extinct genus of side-necked turtle which existed in India during the late Cretaceous period. It was first named in 2001, by Eugene S. Gaffney, Sankar Chatterjee, and Dhiraj K. Rudra, and contains the species Kurmademys kallamedensis. The species name is derived from the Kallamedu Formation of southern India, where the type specimen of the genus was discovered. It was assigned to the family Bothremydidae.

References

External links
 Kurmademys at the Paleobiology Database

Late Cretaceous turtles of Asia
Bothremydidae
Fossils of India
Prehistoric turtle genera
Taxa named by Eugene S. Gaffney